Astros II (Artillery Saturation Rocket System) is a self-propelled multiple rocket launcher produced in Brazil by the Avibras company. It features modular design and employs rockets with calibers ranging from 127 to 450 mm (5–17.72 inches).  It was developed on the basis of a Tectran VBT-2028 6×6 all-terrain vehicle for enhanced mobility based on Mercedes-Benz 2028 truck chassis while later versions use Tatra 817 chassis.

Overview

A full Astros system includes 1 wheeled 4×4 Battalion level Command Vehicle (AV-VCC), which commands 3 batteries, and a series of 4x4 and 6×6 wheeled vehicles. Each battery consists of:
 1 wheeled 4×4 Battery-level Command vehicle (AV-PCC)
 1 wheeled 6×6 Radar Fire Control vehicle (AV-UCF)
 6 wheeled 6×6 Universal Multiple Rocket Launchers vehicle (AV-LMU)
 6 wheeled 6×6 Ammunition Resupply vehicles (AV-RMD)
 1 wheeled 6×6 Field repair/workshop vehicle (AV-OFVE)
 1 wheeled 4×4 Mobile Weather Station vehicle (AV-MET).

In the older version of the system, the fire control vehicle were listed as optional vehicle in a battery.  The command vehicles and weather stations are recent additions, designed to improve overall system performance on newer versions. All vehicles are transportable in a C-130 Hercules. The launcher is capable of firing rockets of different calibers armed with a range of warheads.

Each rocket resupply truck carries up to two complete reloads.

Service history
The Astros II artillery system entered service with the Brazilian Army in 1983. The system is battle proven, having been used in action by the Iraqi Army in the Gulf Wars.

In the 1980s, Avibrás sold an estimated 66 Astros II artillery systems to Iraq. Iraq also built the Sajeel-60 which is a license-built version of the Brazilian SS-60. Sixty Astros II were sold to Saudi Arabia and an unspecified number sold to Bahrain and Qatar. Total sales of the Astros II between 1982 and 1987 reached US$1 billion. This fact made the Astros II multiple rocket launcher the most profitable weapon produced by Avibrás.

In the 1980s and early 1990s, Avibrás manufactured almost exclusively rockets and multiple-launch rocket systems (MLRS), such as the Astros II, in addition to developing antitank and antiship missiles. At its peak, Avibrás employed 6,000 people; later it would be reduced to 900 people in the early 1990s as the arms industry demand fell.  Even so, in the first Gulf War in 1991, the Astros II was successfully used by Saudi Arabia against Iraq. Years earlier, the Astros II system had helped Angola to defeat the UNITA.

New generation

The next step is an ambitious program, the Astros 2020 (Mk6), based on a 6×6 wheeled chassis. Being a new concept, it will require an estimated investment of R$1.2 billion, of which about US$210 million will be invested solely in development. It will be integrated with the cruise missile AVMT-300 with 300-km range during the stage of testing and certification. It is said that the venture will, for example, enable the Army to integrate the Astros with defense anti-aircraft guns, paving the way for the utilization of common platforms, trucks, parts of electronic sensors and command vehicles. The new MK6 system will use Tatra Trucks’ T815-790R39 6×6 and T815-7A0R59 4×4 trucks instead of the original Mercedes-Benz 2028A 6x6 truck. ASTROS 2020 offers several basic improvements including an improved armored cabin, modern digital communications and navigation systems, and a new tracking radar that replaces the AV-UCF's Contraves Fieldguard system. The new tracking radar used by MK6 AV-UCF was latter revealed to be the Fieldguard 3 Military Measurement System from Rheinmetall Air Defence. Four of them are carried. 36 Astros 2020 systems are to be acquired.

Rocket variants

 SS-09TS – fires 70 mm rockets – Loads 40
 SS-30 – fires 127 mm rockets – Loads 32
 SS-40 – fires 180 mm rockets – Loads 16
 SS-40G – fires 180 mm rockets – Loads 16 (GPS Guided)
 SS-60 – fires 300 mm rockets – Loads 4
 SS-80 – fires 300 mm rockets – Loads 4
 SS-80G – fires 300 mm rockets – Loads 4 (GPS Guided)
 SS-150 – fires 450 mm rockets – Loads 4 (GPS Guided)
 AV-TM 300 - fires 450 mm cruise missile – Loads 2
 FOG MPM - fiber optics guided multi-purpose missile – anti-tank, anti-fortification and anti-helicopter missile
 FOG MLM - fiber optics guided multi-purpose missile

Specifications

 Range in indirect fire mode (first figure is minimum range):
 SS-09TS: 4–10 km
 SS-30: 9–30 km
 SS-40: 15–40 km
 SS-40G: 15–40 km
 SS-60: 20–60 km
 SS-80: 22–90 km
 SS-80G: 22–90 km
 SS-150: 29–150 km
 AV-TM 300: 30–300 km
 FOG MPM: 5–60 km
 Armour: classified. Probably light composite to give protection against small-arms fire.
 Armament: one battery of 2, 4, 16 or 32 rocket-launcher tubes
 Performance:
 fording 1.1 m
 vertical obstacle 1 m
 trench 2.29 m
 Ammunition Type: High explosive (HE) with multiple warhead

Operators

 
 
 Brazilian Army: 38 Astros II Mk3, 18 Astros II Mk3M and 22 Astros II Mk6
 Brazilian Marine Corps: 6 Astros II Mk6
  Indonesian Army: 63 Astros II Mk6 (first batch of 36 ordered in 2012 and second batch of 27 delivered in 2020).
 : 66 Astros II (also built under license as the Sajil-60). Only with rockets of shorter range SS-40 and SS-60.
 : It is known that the country was one of the three largest buyers of the system, alongside Iraq and Saudi Arabia, having invested US$2 million to purchase Astros. However, the exact number is undefined.
  Malaysian Army: 54 units of Astros II
 
  Saudi Arabia: 76 Astros II

Potential operators
 : On December 4, 2022, the Brazilian media reported a Ukrainian interest in the ASTROS system, to equip the Army in the Russo-Ukrainian War efforts. The sale was blocked by the Bolsonaro administration. A diplomatic effort by the United States to persuade the president-elect of Brazil, Luiz Inácio Lula da Silva, to unblock the deal was reported on the 5th of December 2022.

See also
 HIMARS
 BM-21
 RM-70
 T-122 Sakarya
 9A52-4 Tornado
 Fajr-5
 TOROS
 Falaq-2
 Pinaka multi-barrel rocket launcher

References

External links

 Astros II Artillery Saturation Rocket System, Brazil
 FAS Military Analysis Network

Wheeled self-propelled rocket launchers
Multiple rocket launchers of Brazil
Modular rocket launchers
Military vehicles introduced in the 1980s